Alma is a former unincorporated community and now a restricted site, the location of a work camp for the county Department of Corrections in Lane County, Oregon, United States.

History
Alma was named in 1886 for a local woman. A post office was established at Alma in 1888, and remained in operation until it was discontinued in 1933.

References

Unincorporated communities in Lane County, Oregon
Unincorporated communities in Oregon